Hawthorne Nights is an album by saxophonist Zoot Sims recorded in 1976 and released by the Pablo label the following year.

Reception

AllMusic reviewer Scott Yanow stated "not a quartet outing but an opportunity for his tenor to be showcased while joined by a nine-piece group that includes six horns (three reeds among them). Bill Holman's inventive arrangements are a large part as to why the date is successful but Sims's playing on the five standards, two Holman pieces and his own "Dark Cloud" should not be overlooked. Fortunately there is also some solo space saved for the talented sidemen ... A well-rounded set of swinging jazz".

Track listing
 "Hawthorne Nights" (Bill Holman) – 4:39
 "Main Stem" (Duke Ellington) – 5:00
 "More Than You Know" (Vincent Youmans, Billy Rose, Edward Eliscu) – 5:57
 "Only a Rose" (Rudolf Friml, Brian Hooker) – 5:06
 "The Girl from Ipanema" (Antônio Carlos Jobim, Vinicius de Moraes, Norman Gimbel) – 4:10
 "I Got It Bad and That Ain't Good" (Ellington, Paul Francis Webster) – 6:15
 "Fillings" (Holman) – 5:22
 "Dark Cloud" (Zoot Sims, Jon Hendricks) – 4:21

Personnel 
Zoot Sims – tenor saxophone
Oscar Brashear – trumpet
Snooky Young – trumpet, flugelhorn
Frank Rosolino – trombone
Richie Kamuca – clarinet, tenor saxophone
Jerome Richardson – clarinet, tenor saxophone, soprano saxophone, alto saxophone
Bill Hood – baritone saxophone, bass clarinet, flute
Ross Tompkins – piano
Monty Budwig – bass
Nick Ceroli – drums
Bill Holman – arranger, conductor

References 

1977 albums
Zoot Sims albums
Pablo Records albums
Albums produced by Norman Granz